These are the results of the women's floor competition, one of six events for female competitors in artistic gymnastics at the 1980 Summer Olympics in Moscow.  The qualification and final rounds took place on July 21, 23 and 25th at the Sports Palace of the Central Lenin Stadium.

Medalists

Results

Qualification

Sixty-two gymnasts competed in the compulsory and optional rounds on July 21 and 23.  The six highest scoring gymnasts advanced to the final on July 25.  Each country was limited to two competitors in the final.  Half of the points earned by each gymnast during both the compulsory and optional rounds carried over to the final.  This constitutes the "prelim" score.

Final

References
Official Olympic Report
www.gymnasticsresults.com
www.gymn-forum.net

Women's floor
1980 in women's gymnastics
Women's events at the 1980 Summer Olympics